North Pocono is a third-class school district in Lackawanna and Wayne Counties in Pennsylvania. The district's population was 20,806 at the time of the 2010 United States Census.

The region served by North Pocono is considered to be the northern tip of the Pocono Mountain region in Northeast Pennsylvania. According to federal census data, North Pocono School District's population has increased by 2,377 residents from 18,429 residents in 2000. In 2009, North Pocono School District residents’ per capita income was $19,688, while the median family income was $49,766. In the Commonwealth, the median family income was $49,501  and the United States median family income was $49,445, in 2010.

A new North Pocono High School was built in 2009, and it opened during the school year of 2009–2010. The old high school, located on Church Street, is now the North Pocono Middle School. It houses grades 6 through 8. The new High School, which is located on Bochicchio Boulevard in Covington Township, houses grades 9 through 12.

North Pocono School District operates 5 schools: Jefferson Elementary Center (K to 3); Moscow Elementary Center (K to 3); North Pocono Intermediate School (4 to 5), North Pocono Middle School (6 to 8), and North Pocono High School (9 to 12).

Regions and constituent municipalities

The district is divided into three regions, which include the following municipalities (labeled by county):

Region I
Elmhurst Township (Lackawanna)
Jefferson Township (Lackawanna)
Roaring Brook Township (Lackawanna)

Region II
Moscow Borough (Lackawanna)
Thornhurst Township (Lackawanna)
Spring Brook Township (Lackawanna)

Region III
Lehigh Township (Wayne)
Clifton Township (Lackawanna)
Covington Township (Lackawanna)
Madison Township (Lackawanna)

Extracurriculars
North Pocono School District offers a variety of clubs, activities, an expansive music program, and an extensive sports program.

Sports
The District funds:

Boys
Baseball – AAA
Basketball- AAA
Cross Country – AAA
Football – AAA
Golf – AAA
Lacrosse – AAAA
Rifle – AAAA
Wrestling – AAA
Soccer – AAA
Tennis – AAA
Track and Field – AAA
Volleyball – AA

Girls
Basketball – AAA
Cheer – AAAA
Cross Country – AA
Golf – AAA
Rifle – AAAA
Soccer (Fall) – AA
Softball – AAA
Girls' Tennis – AAA
Track and Field – AAA
Volleyball – AA
Lacrosse – AAA

Middle School Sports

Boys
Baseball
Basketball
Cross Country
Football
Soccer
Track and Field
Wrestling

Girls
Basketball
Cross Country
Softball
Soccer
Track and Field

References

External links
 District web site

School districts in Lackawanna County, Pennsylvania
School districts in Wayne County, Pennsylvania